The Dodge Mansion, also known as Turner-Dodge House, is a historic house in Lansing, Michigan that was built in 1855.  It was listed on the National Register of Historic Places (NRHP) in 1972 as Dodge Mansion.

The Turner-Dodge House is now a museum dedicated to Lansing's early pioneers. The museum sits in the Classical Revival-styled Turner-Dodge Mansion, built in 1858 for James and Marion Turner, and later expanded by their daughter and her husband.

History
In 1847, the state legislature established a new capitol at the then substantially unsettled Lansing location. Merchant James Madison Turner moved from Mason to the new settlement, selecting a home site at this location. In the 1850s, Turner built a large mansion on his property. He lived there until his death in 1869, after which his widow remained in the house. Ownership of the house passed to his son James Munroe Turner, who lived there until his death. After this, James M's sister, Abbey, and her husband Frank Dodge purchased the house.

In 1900, the Dodges hired Lansing architect Darius B. Moon to modernize and renovate the house. The project was completed in 1903, resulting in a house with a completely changed appearance, almost entirely obliterating the design of the original house. Frank Dodge died in 1929, after which his daughter Josephine (Dodge) MacLean lived in the house. The Great Lakes Bible College acquired the house in 1958, and occupied it until 1972 when it moved to another campus. The city of Lansing purchased the property in 1974. In the 1990s and 2000s, substantial renovation was done to the house. The house is open as a museum, and for special events.

Description
The Turner-Dodge House is a large Georgian Revival house covered in brick Veneer. It has a three-story central section flanked by -story wings. The house has a large two-story front porch with Ionic columns, sitting on a stone foundation. The house is encircled by a massive wooden cornice. A large porte cochere is located in the rear.

On the interior, the house has large classical doorways, multiple fireplaces, and beveled and leaded glass windows.

See also
Smith–Turner House, also NRHP-listed in Lansing

References

External links
 Turner-Dodge House - Lansing Parks & Recreation, official site

National Register of Historic Places in Lansing, Michigan
Michigan State Historic Sites in Ingham County
Houses completed in 1855
Museums in Lansing, Michigan
Buildings and structures in Lansing, Michigan
Historic house museums in Michigan
1855 establishments in Michigan